Pequea is a variation of the Shawnee Pekowi.

Pequea may also refer to the following in Pennsylvania:
Pequea Bridge (disambiguation)
Pequea Creek, a tributary of the Susquehanna River
Pequea, Pennsylvania, an unincorporated community in Martic Township in Lancaster County
Pequea Township, Lancaster County, Pennsylvania
Pequea Valley School District, in Lancaster County
Pequea Valley High School, in the above district